Grant Guthrie (born February 9, 1948) is a former American football placekicker. He played for the Buffalo Bills from 1970 to 1971.

References

1948 births
Living people
American football placekickers
Florida State Seminoles football players
Buffalo Bills players
Jacksonville Sharks (WFL) players
Birmingham Americans players